Johnny Påhlsson (13 May 1941 – 21 November 2009) was a Swedish sport shooter who competed in the 1972 Summer Olympics, in the 1976 Summer Olympics, in the 1984 Summer Olympics, and in the 1988 Summer Olympics.

References

1941 births
2009 deaths
Swedish male sport shooters
Trap and double trap shooters
Olympic shooters of Sweden
Shooters at the 1972 Summer Olympics
Shooters at the 1976 Summer Olympics
Shooters at the 1984 Summer Olympics
Shooters at the 1988 Summer Olympics
20th-century Swedish people
21st-century Swedish people